Junior roller derby is the sport of roller derby, modified for children and adolescents up to 18 years of age. The sport is played in both modified-contact, known as "positional blocking," and full-contact approaches, to facilitate safety across multiple age and skill groups.

Competitive junior roller derby worldwide is facilitated by the Junior Roller Derby Association (JRDA).

Growth of the Sport
The origins of junior roller derby are in contention, with multiple leagues claiming they were founded earliest. The Seattle Derby Brats and the Tucson Derby Brats, the first two junior roller derby leagues to present teams for inter-league play, are the most likely candidates for the oldest league in existence. The Tucson Derby Brats were established in Tucson, Arizona by three young fans of the Tucson Roller Derby adult league: Tristan Hasman, Arlee Garcia-Thwing and Zoe Reeves. The Seattle Derby Brats were founded by Krista Lafontaine Williams, a member of Rat City Roller Derby, in Seattle, Washington.

At the 2007 Women's Flat Track Derby Association Texas Shootout Nationals Tournament in Austin, Texas, the two existing junior leagues, the Tucson Derby Brats and the Seattle Derby Brats, held a demonstration bout between rounds in the tournament. Following this national exposure, leagues began forming in other towns across the United States. In order to support the growth of new leagues and standardize rule sets, the Junior Roller Derby Association (JRDA) was formed in 2009 and incorporated in March, 2010 in Austin.

In February 2010, there were over 40 junior roller derby programs across four countries at various stages in development. In 2013 junior roller derby grew its international presence including 38 international leagues located in Canada, Belgium, Japan and Australia. Inter-league competition of all junior leagues worldwide is maintained by the Junior Roller Derby Association (JRDA).

Junior Roller Derby Association (JRDA)
On October 1, 2009 the Junior Roller Derby Association (JRDA) was formally established. Continuing to grow and thrive, JRDA implemented a formal membership program providing junior leagues with resources such as:

 new league start-up and expansion for existing leagues
 creating modification to the current flat track derby rules that allowed for participation at all skill levels
 creating a training program for advancing skater skills
 partnering with roller derby organizations to provide insurance
 plan skater development
 match skaters for safe and fair inter-league play

In the last three months of 2009 the board of directors with assistance from dedicated committee volunteers drafted policies and mission statements needed to begin local grassroots junior roller derby programs.

In 2010 the JRDA began the process of incorporating in Austin, Texas as a 501(c)3 non-profit corporation for promoting the advancement of national and international amateur athletics through roller derby.

The mission of JRDA is to nurture bold self-confidence in youth by developing teamwork and athletic ability while treasuring individuality within a culture of integration, encouragement, and service to others. JRDA partners with competitive & recreational junior leagues, communities & schools, mentors & families; to empower youth through the international sport of roller derby.

The JRDA uses The Rules of Flat Track Roller Derby as per the Women's Flat Track Derby Association with addenda.

Junior Roller Derby championships

In 2014, the JRDA hosted the first junior roller derby championships in Daytona Beach, Florida. 17 National JRDA Member Leagues participated in a 2-day Tournament played on 4 tracks.

With the implementation of the JRDA Games Dept., and newly formed Games Sanctioning policy, Team Divisions, and Team Rankings System at the end of 2014, the JRDA highlighted the top teams in the world with an invitation to participate in the 2015 JRDA Championships, held in Kent, Washington. The top teams from each Division played at the highest level of Junior Derby over 3 days on 2 tracks.

Junior Roller Derby World Cup

2015

July 2015 the JRDA hosted the inaugural Junior Roller Derby World Cup held in Kent, Washington.

Although a number of nations were expected to participate, only 3 countries attended, with the USA providing two teams, one representing USA West and the other USA East. The two other nations were Canada and Australia.

The first day of competition saw each team play each other to determine seeding for the following days competition bracket. The final was won by USA West defeating USA East. Canada took third place over Australia.

2018
The 2018 edition of the Junior Roller Derby World Cup was held in Feasterville-Trevose, Pennsylvania in July 2018. The participating nations again were Australia, Canada and the United States split into East and West teams whilst Team Great Britain Junior Roller Derby and a Europe representative team were involved for the first time.

2021
The 2021 Junior World Cup host city was announced as the Canadian city of Regina, Saskatchewan. however this was cancelled due to the Covid 19 pandemic.

2023 
The 2023 Junior World Cup host city has been announced as the French city of Valence.

JRDA and the AAU Junior Olympics

In February 2015 the JRDA made history when they announced their partnership with the Amateur Athletic Union (AAU) to bring Junior Roller Derby to one of the largest world stages by taking Junior Derby to the Olympics.

The JRDA was quoted in saying, "The Junior Roller Derby Association (JRDA) and the Amateur Athletic Union (AAU) are proud to present a unique competition opportunity for junior roller derby athletes in a co-ed event hosted in Lincoln, Nebraska July, 2016."

They then went on to add, "In this collaboration with USARS to bring Jr Derby into the AAU Junior Olympics, the JRDA is taking a big step forward in the development of the sport." This will be the first Roller Derby games that will be played and recognized by an Olympic committee.

References

External links
 The Tucson Derby Brats
 Junior Roller Derby Association
 JRDA Facebook

Sports clubs established in 2007
Roller derby